A suite in a hotel or other public accommodation (e.g. a cruise ship) denotes, according to most dictionary definitions, connected rooms under one room number.  Hotels may refer to suites as a class of accommodations with more space than a typical hotel room, but technically speaking there should be more than one room to constitute a true suite.

In luxury or upscale accommodations, such as Ritz Carlton, InterContinental, Marriott, Westin, Four Seasons, Shangri-La or St. Regis, key features may include multiple rooms. Many independent properties have one or more honeymoon suites. The most luxurious accommodation in a hotel is often called the presidential suite or royal suite.

Upper-midscale accommodations, such as Comfort Suites, Hampton Inn & Suites, and Candlewood Suites, may denote suites as one room with more space and furniture than a standard hotel room, and so technically these would not be considered suites of rooms per se. In addition to one or more beds and a bathroom, such "suites" include a living or sitting area, often equipped with a sofa bed. Dining, office and kitchen facilities are also added in many of these "suites." Some chains, such as Staybridge Suites and Home2 Suites by Hilton, offer only suites, which often cater to business travelers who appreciate additional space and may use it to host small meetings or entertain clients.

Bridal and honeymoon suites
As a form of niche marketing, hôteliers occasionally offer premium rooms with specialised amenities aimed at couples or newlyweds. 

While Niagara Falls had branded itself "the honeymoon capital of the world" as early as the railway era of the late 1800s, its first tentative promotion of campground "honeymoon huts" dates to the 1920s. The "honeymoon suite" pattern of multiple destinations offering bridal suites with heart-shaped tubs is a more modern one, which grew in the post-World War II era of aeroplanes and motorcar travel.

The presence of special "honeymoon suites" or "romance suites" marketed to couples, newlyweds or "second honeymooners" is widespread, appearing not only in hotel/motel or resort accommodation, but also aboard cruise ships.

See also
Hotel
Motel
Resort
Tourism

References

Hotel terminology
Rooms